The Delaware County Daily Times is a daily newspaper published in the Primos section of Upper Darby Township, Pennsylvania in the United States. It is the only major newspaper in the state to be branded with a county name rather than a city. It is known for its colorful "Sound Off" feature and allowing voices from the community on either side of the political spectrum to be heard.

The newspaper began as the Chester Daily Times in 1876. Its current name was adopted in 1959 and its offices left the economically declining City of Chester, Pennsylvania for Primos, an unincorporated postal designation in Upper Darby Township. According to the Journal Register Company, it has the largest circulation of any suburban paper in the Philadelphia area.  The Sunday edition is known as the Delaware County Sunday Times.

History
The first edition of the paper, then known as the Chester Times, was a four-page broadsheet printed on September 7, 1876, selling for one cent. Pictures began to appear in the paper by 1915. In November 1959, the Chester Times changed its name to the Delaware County Daily Times. 

On June 15, 1981, the paper transformed from a broadsheet to a tabloid and made the switch from an afternoon paper to a morning edition. Previously a six-day paper, the Delaware County Daily Times began to print Saturday editions on October 25, 1997.

Notable former reporters
 William Cameron Sproul,  former Pennsylvania governor and 1920 Republican presidential candidate.
 F. Gilman Spencer Sr., 1974 Pulitzer Prize winner in editorial writing.
 Orrin C. Evans, pioneering African-American journalist
 Joby Warrick, 1996 Pulitzer Prize winner for public service in journalism.

Selected editors
 Phil Heron (to 2020)
 Joseph Hart (2020-2022)

References

External links
 Delaware County Daily and Sunday Times

Delaware County, Pennsylvania
21st Century Media publications
Daily newspapers published in Pennsylvania